is a Japanese artistic gymnast.

Kaya was part of the Japanese team that won the gold medal in the team event at the 2015 World Artistic Gymnastics Championships. He also won a gold medal in the 2015 Asian Championships in Hiroshima. At the 2018 World Artistic Gymnastics Championships he won bronze with the team to help Japan qualify to the 2020 Summer Olympics.

Personal life 
Kaya began gymnastics in 2004 at the age of eight. He was inspired by watching the Japanese artistic gymnastics team win gold in the team event at the 2004 Olympic Games in Athens, Greece.

Kaya won the Inzai Citizen Honorary Award in 2015 and the Narashino Mayor Award in 2014. He received a doctoral degree in sports science from Juntendo University.

On 11 January 2022, Kazuma Kaya registered for marriage with his longtime girlfriend Seira Eto. The wedding ceremony was held on 15 January 2023 with the participation of Kohei Uchimura, Kenzo Shirai, Daiki Hashimoto & many other elite gymnasts.

Career

2015 
Kaya competed at the 2015 World Championships in Glasgow, Scotland, where he placed third on pommel horse. His team placed first.

2018 
Kaya competed at the 2018 World Championships in Doha, Qatar, where he placed sixth on the all-around. His team placed third.

2019 
Kaya competed at the 2019 World Championships in Stuttgart, Germany, where he placed third on the all-around and parallel bars, and fifth on pommel horse. His team placed third.

2021 
At the 2020 Summer Olympics in Tokyo, Japan, Kaya competed for Japan, a team that included Kaya, Daiki Hashimoto, Takeru Kitazono and Wataru Tanigawa. The team won Olympic silver with a combined score of 262.397, 0.103 points between the winning team. He also won a bronze on the individual pommel horse event.

At the 2021 World Championships also held at home in the replacement city of Kitakyushu, Kaya won the silver on individual pommel horse, and placed sixth on both individual floor exercise and parallel bars events.

Competitive history

References 

FIG

1996 births
Japanese male artistic gymnasts
Sportspeople from Chiba Prefecture
Living people
Medalists at the World Artistic Gymnastics Championships
Medalists at the 2019 Summer Universiade
Universiade medalists in gymnastics
Universiade gold medalists for Japan
Universiade silver medalists for Japan
Universiade bronze medalists for Japan
Gymnasts at the 2020 Summer Olympics
Olympic gymnasts of Japan
Olympic silver medalists for Japan
Olympic bronze medalists for Japan
Medalists at the 2020 Summer Olympics
Olympic medalists in gymnastics
20th-century Japanese people
21st-century Japanese people